Paduka Sri Sultan Muhammad Jiwa Zainal Adilin Mu'adzam Shah I ibni al-Marhum Sultan Ataullah Muhammad Shah I (died 15 June 1506; also spelt Sultan Muhammad Jiwa Zain al-‘Adilan Mu’azzam Shah) was the ninth Sultan of Kedah. His reign was from 1473 to 1506 and was marked by reform in land size and encourage the used of gold and silver from barter.

External links
 List of Sultans of Kedah

1506 deaths
15th-century Sultans of Kedah
16th-century Sultans of Kedah